The High Commissioner of Australia to the Cook Islands is an officer of the Australian Department of Foreign Affairs and Trade and the head of the High Commission of the Commonwealth of Australia in the Cook Islands. The position has the rank and status of an Ambassador Extraordinary and Plenipotentiary and the high commissioner resides in Rarotonga. The office of high commissioner is vacant since August 2022.

Posting history

In 1994, Australia formally established diplomatic relations with the Cook Islands, a self-governing state since 1974 in free association with New Zealand, with the high commissioner in Wellington also serving as high commissioner to the Cook Islands. In November 2018, Prime Minister Scott Morrison announced an expansion of Australia's diplomatic representation to all members of the Pacific Islands Forum, including opening a new high commission in the Cook Islands and Niue. On 18 December 2019, Foreign Minister Marise Payne. announced the establishment of a resident Australian High Commission in the Cook Islands to "help underscore Australia’s focus on deepening engagement across the region." The first resident high commissioner, Christopher Watkins, took up office in Rarotonga on 17 March 2020.

Heads of mission

See also

 Australia–New Zealand relations
 Foreign relations of the Cook Islands
 Foreign relations of Australia

References

External links

Australian High Commission, Rarotonga

Australia and the Commonwealth of Nations
Cook Islands and the Commonwealth of Nations
 
Cook Islands
Australia